Trinitromethane, also referred to  as nitroform, is a nitroalkane and oxidizer with chemical formula HC(NO2)3.  It was first obtained in 1857 as the ammonium salt by the Russian chemist Leon Nikolaevich Shishkov (1830–1908).  In 1900, it was discovered that nitroform can be produced by the reaction of acetylene with anhydrous nitric acid.  This method went on to become the industrial process of choice during the 20th century.  In the laboratory, nitroform can also be produced by hydrolysis of tetranitromethane under mild basic conditions.

Acidity
Trinitromethane as a neutral molecule is colorless. It is highly acidic, easily forming an intensely yellow anion, (NO2)3C−.  The pKa of trinitromethane has been measured at 0.17 ± 0.02 at 20 °C, which is remarkably acidic for a methane derivative. Trinitromethane easily dissolves in water to form an acidic yellow solution.

There is some evidence that the anion, which obeys the 4n+2 Hückel rule, is aromatic.

Nitroform salts
Trinitromethane forms a series of bright yellow ionic salts.  Many of these salts tend to be unstable and can be easily detonated by heat or impact.

The potassium salt of nitroform, KC(NO2)3 is a lemon yellow crystalline solid that decomposes slowly at room temperatures and explodes above 95 °C.  The ammonium salt is somewhat more stable, and deflagrates or explodes above 200 °C.  The hydrazine salt, hydrazinium nitroformate is thermally stable to above 125 °C and is being investigated as an ecologically friendly oxidizer for use in solid fuels for rockets.

References

Nitroalkanes
Acids
Substances discovered in the 1900s